Taun may refer to:

 Pometia pinnata, the taun tree, a tropical hardwood fruit tree
 Tione di Trento, Trentino, Italy; also called "Taun"
 taun, the Javanese lunar year, see Javanese calendar
 taun, a wasei-eigo term, see List of wasei-eigo

See also
 Tauns River, India
 Tauntaun
 Ton (disambiguation)
 Town (disambiguation)